Thomas Taylour, Earl of Bective (11 February 1844 – 15 December 1893), styled Lord Kenlis until 1870, was an Anglo-Irish Conservative politician.

Bective was the son of Thomas Taylour, 3rd Marquess of Headfort, by his first wife Amelia (née Thompson). Kenlis was educated at Eton and Christ Church, Oxford. He entered Parliament for Westmorland in 1871 (succeeding his father), a seat he held until 1885, when the constituency was abolished, and then represented Kendal until 1892.  In 1884 he wrote to the Manchester-based Women's Suffrage Journal in support of the principle of women's suffrage, stating, "I think that (with certain limitations) women ought to be owners of the franchise.  In fact, I think many women, especially freeholders and those who own a certain amount of property, are much more entitled to it than many men whom it is intended to enfranchise by the present Bill [passed into law as the Representation of the People Act 1884]."

Lord Bective married Lady Alice Maria, daughter of Arthur Hill, 4th Marquess of Downshire, in 1867. They had two daughters:
 Lady Olivia Caroline Amelia Taylour (22 January 1869 – 26 November 1939), married Lord Henry Cavendish Cavendish-Bentinck, half-brother of the 6th Duke of Portland, without issue
 Lady Evelyn Alice Estelle Taylour (10 February 1873 – 16 September 1875)

Bective served as High Sheriff of Westmorland in 1868. He died December 1893, aged 49, predeceasing his father by seven months. His half-brother Geoffrey later succeeded in the marquessate. The Countess of Bective died in 1928.

He was a Freemason, and served from 1886 as Grand Sovereign (head of the Order) of the Masonic and Military Order of the Red Cross of Constantine and the Appendant Orders of the Holy Sepulchre and of St John the Evangelist, which is a masonic order open only to trinitarian Christians. His brother Geoffrey, who succeeded to the marquessate, was also a Freemason.

See also
Marquess of Headfort

Notes

References 
Kidd, Charles, Williamson, David (editors). Debrett's Peerage and Baronetage (1990 edition). New York: St Martin's Press, 1990.

External links 
 

1844 births
1893 deaths
Alumni of Christ Church, Oxford
Conservative Party (UK) MPs for English constituencies
Courtesy earls
Heirs apparent who never acceded
People educated at Eton College
UK MPs 1868–1874
UK MPs 1874–1880
UK MPs 1880–1885
UK MPs 1885–1886
UK MPs 1886–1892
High Sheriffs of Westmorland
Irish Freemasons
Thomas
Freemasons of the United Grand Lodge of England